Pippa Steel (15 April 1948, Flensburg, Germany – 29 May 1992) was a British actress best known for her roles in two Hammer horror films: The Vampire Lovers (1970) and Lust for a Vampire (1971).

Career
Her other films included Stranger in the House (1967), Take a Girl Like You (1970) and Young Winston (1972). She was also active in television, making guest appearances in series such as Department S, Z-Cars, UFO, Public Eye, The Adventurer and Blake's 7 (as Maja in the first episode, The Way Back). She also appeared in the 1986 BBC sitcom Dear John written by John Sullivan. She appeared in the pilot episode A Singular Man as Fay the AA counsellor.

Death
She died from cancer, aged 44, in 1992 in London, England.

Filmography

References

External links
 
 http://www.horrorstars.net/pippa-steel.html
 http://hammerglam.topcities.com/actresses/steele.htm

1948 births
1992 deaths
British film actresses
British television actresses
20th-century British actresses
People from Flensburg